Bakhri Ahmad Khan is a village situated on the bank of river Indus in Layyah District, Punjab, Pakistan.

Many people work in public services. Gurmani Balouch is the main caste of this village.

Bakhri Ahmad Khan is covered by a union council, numbered 7 of the 42 union councils of Layyah tehsil. The name of its mouza is Bait Dabli. The total of registered voters is 1,336. The total population is about 2,000 according to GeoNames geographical database.

A major problem of this village is flooding and lack of proper healthcare facilities.

References 

Villages in Layyah District